Events in 1961 in animation.

Events

January
 January 24: Voice actor Mel Blanc suffers a car accident which leaves him in a coma for two weeks. He is brought back to consciousness by addressing his Looney Tunes characters, in whose voices he replies.
 January 25: Walt Disney's One Hundred and One Dalmatians premieres, directed by Wolfgang Reitherman, Hamilton Luske and Clyde Geronimi.
 January 30: The first episode of The Yogi Bear Show is broadcast, marking the debuts of Snagglepuss and Yakky Doodle.

February
 February 20: Wolfgang Reitherman's Goofy cartoon Aquamania premieres.
 February 25: The first episode of Art Clokey's Davey and Goliath is broadcast.

April
 April 17: 33rd Academy Awards: Munro wins the Academy Award for Best Animated Short.

May
 May 1: The first episode of Otogi Manga Calendar is broadcast, the first anime TV series.

June
 June 21: Hamilton Luske's The Litterbug, the final theatrical Donald Duck cartoon premieres.

August
 August: The first episode of Pingwings is broadcast.

September
 September 7: Switchin' Kitten, the first Tom and Jerry cartoon directed by Gene Deitch premieres.
 September 15: The Flintstones episode The Hit Song Writers is first broadcast, guest starring Hoagy Carmichael. 
 September 24: The first episode of Walt Disney's Wonderful World of Color premieres, in which Ludwig von Drake makes his debut. 
 September 27: 
 The first episode of Hanna-Barbera's Top Cat is broadcast.
 The first episode of Jay Ward's Dudley Do-Right is broadcast.

October
 October 4: The first episode of The Alvin Show is broadcast.

Specific date unknown
 Bagdasarian Productions is founded by Ross Bagdasarian Sr. to produce works based on his fictional characters, Alvin and the Chipmunks. Their first production was the animated series The Alvin Show.
 Lev Atamanov's The Key premieres.
 Arthur Lipsett's Very Nice, Very Nice premieres.

Films released 

 January 25 - One Hundred and One Dalmatians (United States)
 March 5 - The Coyote's Lament (United States)
 June 28 - Cipollino (Soviet Union)
 July 19 - The Orphan Brother (Japan)
 December 8 - The Strange History of the Citizens of Shilda (East Germany)
 Specific date unknown - The Key (Soviet Union)

Television series 

 January 1 - The Dick Tracy Show debuts in syndication.
 January 30 - The Yogi Bear Show debuts in syndication.
 April 3 - Minna no Uta debuts on NHK.
 May 1 - Otogi Manga Calendar debuts on TBS.
 September - The Dudley Do-Right Show debuts on ABC.
 September 1 - Tales of the Wizard of Oz debuts in syndication.
 September 27 - Top Cat debuts on ABC.
 October 3 - Calvin and the Colonel debuts on ABC.
 October 4 - The Alvin Show debuts on ABC and NBC.
 Specific date unknown: 
 Out of the Inkwell and The Underseas Explorers debut in syndication.
 The Pingwings debuts on ITV.

Births

January
 January 4: Graham McTavish, Scottish actor (voice of Dracula in Castlevania, Loki in The Avengers: Earth's Mightiest Heroes, Sebastian Shaw in Wolverine and the X-Men, Savanti Romero in Teenage Mutant Ninja Turtles, Fergus McDuck in DuckTales).
 January 9: 
 Candi Milo, American voice actress (voice of Sweetie Pie in Tiny Toon Adventures, Red in 2 Stupid Dogs, Mom and Teacher in Cow and Chicken, Crystal and Amber in Scooby-Doo and the Alien Invaders, Coco, Madame Foster, and Cheese in Foster's Home for Imaginary Friends, Ms. Nora Wakeman in My Life as a Teenage Robot, The Flea in ¡Mucha Lucha!, Snap in ChalkZone, continued voice of Dexter in Dexter's Laboratory and Granny in Looney Tunes).
 Al Jean, American writer, animator and producer (The Simpsons, co-creator of The Critic).
 January 10: Steve Hickner, American animator and film director.
 January 13: Julia Louis-Dreyfuss, American actress and comedian (voice of Princess Atta in A Bug's Life, Laurel Lightfoot in Onward, Gloria in The Simpsons, Rochelle in Planes, Julia in the Dr. Katz, Professional Therapist episode "Ben Treats", Miss Felter in the Hey Arnold! episode "Crush on Teacher").
 January 14:
 Japhet Asher, English-born American television producer and writer (MTV Animation, Pet Alien).
 Robert Walker, Canadian-American animator (Atkinson Film-Arts, The Raccoons, Walt Disney Animation Studios), storyboard artist (Dennis the Menace), background artist (COPS) and director (Brother Bear), (d. 2015).
 January 18: Bob Peterson, American animator, director, screenwriter, storyboard artist, and actor (Pixar).
 January 28:
 Michael Paraskevas, American illustrator, cartoonist and animation producer (co-creator of The Kids from Room 402, Maggie and the Ferocious Beast and Marvin the Tap-Dancing Horse).
 Robbyn Kirmsse, American singer and actress (voice of Ember McLain in Danny Phantom, Germette in the Curious George episode "The Inside Story", singing voice of Penny Sanchez in ChalkZone).
 January 29: Michael Ferris, American television writer (Rugrats, Beethoven, Æon Flux, Recess, The Simpsons) and script consultant (Hey Arnold!).
 January 30: Denys Cowan, American television producer (Static Shock, The Boondocks), storyboard artist (Joseph: King of Dreams, Invasion America, The Electric Piper), and co-founder of Milestone Media.

February
 February 4: Ron Scalera, American marketer and promotion executive (executive in charge for The Simpsons episode "The Simpsons 138th Episode Spectacular"), (d. 2010).
 February 5: Bruce Timm, American artist, character designer, animator, writer, producer, and actor (Warner Bros. Animation).
 February 13: Henry Rollins, American singer, writer, spoken word artist, actor, and presenter (voice of Mad Stan in Batman Beyond, Zaheer in The Legend of Korra, Jonny Rancid in Teen Titans, Skylar in Shorty McShorts' Shorts, Bob Rainicorn/Cookie Man in Adventure Time, Kilowog in Green Lantern: Emerald Knights, Tri-Klops in Masters of the Universe: Revelation, Bonk in Batman Beyond: Return of the Joker, Cliff Steele/Robotman in the Batman: The Brave and the Bold episode "The Last Patrol!", Trucker in the American Dad! episode "Chimdale", Skeletony in the Uncle Grandpa episode "Hide and Seek", Speedy Silverado in the Sheriff Callie's Wild West episode "Blazing Skaters").
 February 23: Don Rhymer, American screenwriter and film producer (Fish Police, Surf's Up, Blue Sky Studios), (d. 2012).
 February 27: Michaela Pavlátová, Czech animator and film director (Reci, Reci, Reci (Words, Words, Words), Repete, Tram, My Sunny Maad).

March
 March 4: Steven Weber, American actor (voice of Green Goblin and Venom in Ultimate Spider-Man, Charlie B. Barkin in All Dogs Go to Heaven: The Series, Alfred Pennyworth in Batman: Return of the Caped Crusaders, Batman vs. Two-Face, and the Scooby-Doo and Guess Who? episode "What a Night for a Dark Knight!", Brian Hackett in Duckman, Beyonder in Avengers Assemble, Odysseus in Hercules).
 March 8: Jess Winfield, American novelist, television writer (Disney Television Animation), and voice actor (continued voice of Jumba Jookiba in the Lilo & Stitch franchise).
 March 11: Greg Kramer, British-Canadian author, actor, director and magician (voice of Anton in George and Martha, Nemo in Arthur, additional voices in Tripping the Rift), (d. 2013).
 March 13: Paul Berry, British animator and director (The Sandman, worked for Cosgrove Hall and Henry Selick), (d. 2001).
 March 19: Jonathan Collier, American television producer and writer (The Simpsons, King of the Hill, What's New, Scooby-Doo?, The Goode Family).
 March 20: Louis Chirillo, American-Canadian former actor (voice of Ed in Sitting Ducks, Salem in Sabrina: Friends Forever, Ken Kelley in Being Ian, Ransack in Transformers: Cybertron, Dukey and Mr. Teacherman in Johnny Test, Jimmy and Dogwood in Krypto the Superdog, Shaman in Pucca, Living Laser in Iron Man: Armored Adventures, Wormwood in Barbie: The Pearl Princess, Lion in the Tom and Jerry Tales episode "You're Lion").
 March 21: Kathy Zielinski, American animator (Walt Disney Animation Studios, FernGully: The Last Rainforest, DreamWorks Animation, The Book of Life, The Simpsons) and character designer (FernGully: The Last Rainforest, Pocahontas).
 March 25: Aron Warner, American film producer and voice actor (Shrek).
 March 29: Amy Sedaris, American actress and comedian (voice of Foxy Loxy in Chicken Little, Princess Carolyn in BoJack Horseman, Cinderella in Shrek the Third, Mina Loveberry in Star vs. the Forces of Evil, Pepper in DuckTales, Ma Angler in SpongeBob SquarePants, Bandit Princess in the Adventure Time episode "I Am a Sword", Yellow Zircon and Blue Zircon in the Steven Universe episode "The Trial").

April
 April 3: Eddie Murphy, American actor and comedian (voice of Mushu in Mulan, Donkey in the Shrek franchise, creator of and voice of Thurgood Orenthal Stubbs in The PJs).
 April 8: Gregg Vanzo, American animator (Marvel Productions, Garfield: His 9 Lives, Looney Tunes), overseas supervisor (The Ren & Stimpy Show, Beavis and Butt-Head, The Critic, Timon & Pumbaa, Stitch! The Movie), director (The Simpsons, The Maxx, Futurama) and producer (founder of Rough Draft Studios).
 April 13: Liz Callaway, American actress and singer (singing voice of the title character in Anastasia, Jasmine in the Aladdin sequels, Odette in The Swan Princess, and Kiara in The Lion King II: Simba's Pride).
 April 20: Don Mattingly, American former baseball baseman, coach and manager (voiced himself in The Simpsons episode "Homer at the Bat").
 April 21: Cathy Cavadini, American voice actress (voice of Blossom in The Powerpuff Girls, Tanya Mousekewitz in An American Tail: Fievel Goes West).
 April 28: Jamieson Price, American actor (voice of Dreyfus in The Seven Deadly Sins, Gula in DokiDoki! PreCure, Sojiro Sakura in Persona 5: The Animation, Bearbarian in Power Players).

May
 May 3: Joe Murray, American animator, cartoonist, illustrator, designer, writer, producer and director (creator of Rocko's Modern Life, Camp Lazlo and Let's Go Luna!).
 May 6:
 Wally Wingert, American voice actor (voice of Almighty Tallest Red in Invader Zim, Renji Abarai in Bleach, Rufus Shinra in Final Fantasy VII: Advent Children, Yuuichirou Jumada in Sailor Moon, Aoba Yamashiro in Naruto, Kotetsu Kaburagi in Tiger & Bunny, Jon Arbuckle in The Garfield Show, Ant-Man and MODOK in The Avengers: Earth's Mightiest Heroes, Cubot in Sonic Boom).
 George Clooney, American actor and filmmaker (voice of Doctor Gouache in South Park: Bigger, Longer & Uncut, Mr. Fox in Fantastic Mr. Fox, Sparky in the South Park episode "Big Gay Al's Big Gay Boat Ride").
 May 12: Robert Cait, Canadian voice actor (voice of Col. Paul 'Crowbar' Corbin and Gen. Torvek in Starcom: The U.S. Space Force, Proud Pork in Piggsburg Pigs!, Colossus in X-Men, Mr. Wilter and Blocky in ChalkZone, Jake in Spirit: Stallion of the Cimarron, Felix's Father, Constable Gallagher, Insane Santa and Absent-Minded Santa in Santa's Apprentice, Victorian Santa in The Magic Snowflake, French Guard in Mr. Peabody & Sherman, Boris Badenov in Rocky & Bullwinkle, Slab in the Quack Pack episode "Huey Duck, P.I.", Slab Rankle and Sgt. Shriver in the Invader Zim episode "FBI Warning of Doom", Norm the Genie in The Fairly OddParents episode "Fairy Idol", additional voices in My Pet Monster, Beetlejuice, The Adventures of Tintin, Duckman and Max Steel).
 May 16: Kevin McDonald, Canadian actor and comedian (voice of Pleakley in the Lilo & Stitch franchise, Almighty Tallest Purple in Invader Zim, Waffle in Catscratch, Albus Duckweed in Amphibia).
 May 21: Anne D. Bernstein, American television writer (Video Power, KaBlam!, MTV Animation, The Backyardigans, Viva Piñata, Angelo Rules, Kit and Kate, Super Wings), (d. 2022).
 May 27: Peri Gilpin, American actress (voice of Raksha in The Jungle Book: Mowgli's Story, Jane Proudfoot in Final Fantasy: The Spirits Within, Hecate in Hercules, Volcana in Superman: The Animated Series, Desiree in Danny Phantom).
 May 29: Linda Wallem, American actress, comedienne, singer, writer and producer (voice of Dr. Paula Hutchison, Virginia Wolfe and other various characters in Rocko's Modern Life, Aunt Gretchen and Female Giraffe in Rocko's Modern Life: Static Cling, Mom in the HBO Storybook Musicals episode "Alexander and the Terrible, Horrible, No Good, Very Bad Day").
 May 31: Anthony Agrusa, American animator (Hanna-Barbera, The Legends of Treasure Island, Meena, 101 Dalmatians: The Series, The Mighty Kong, Futurama, Boo Boo Runs Wild, What a Cartoon!, King of the Hill), storyboard artist (Family Guy, American Dad!), overseas supervisor (Boo Boo Runs Wild) and director (The Cleveland Show, Family Guy).

June
 June 5: Mary Kay Bergman, American voice actress (voice of the Bimbettes in Beauty and the Beast, Quasimodo's mother in The Hunchback of Notre Dame, Liane Cartman, Sheila Broflovski, Shelly Marsh, Sharon Marsh, Mrs. McCormick and Wendy Testaburger in South Park, Banshee in Extreme Ghostbusters, Barbara Gordon/Batgirl in Batman & Mr. Freeze: SubZero, Timmy Turner in Oh Yeah! Cartoons, Gwen Stacy in the Spider-Man episode "Farewell Spider-Man", continued voice of Dr. Blight in Captain Planet and the Planeteers and Daphne Blake in Scooby-Doo), (d. 1999).
 June 9: Michael J. Fox, Canadian-American retired actor (voice of Milo Thatch in Atlantis: The Lost Empire, the title character in Stuart Little, Stuart Little 2 and Stuart Little 3: Call of the Wild, Gandhi's Remaining Kidney in the Clone High episode "Escape to Beer Mountain: A Rope of Sand", Michael and Werewolf in the Phineas and Ferb episode "The Curse of Candace", himself in the Corner Gas Animated episode "Dream Waiver").
 June 12: Jefferson R. Weekley, American background artist and prop designer (The Simpsons, Family Guy).
 June 18: Ron Hughart, American animator (Mighty Mouse: The New Adventures, Garfield and Friends, Cool World, Family Dog, 2 Stupid Dogs), storyboard artist (Hulk Hogan's Rock 'n' Wrestling) and director (The Ren & Stimpy Show, Futurama, Warner Bros. Animation, My Life as a Teenage Robot, American Dad!).
 June 22: Joe Aaron, American screenwriter and producer (Doug).
 June 25: Ricky Gervais, English actor, comedian, writer (The Simpsons) and director (voice of Penguin in Robbie the Reindeer in Legend of the Lost Tribe, Bugsy in Valiant, Mr. James Bing in Escape from Planet Earth, The Conceited Man in The Little Prince, The Cat in The Willoughbys, Ika Chu in Paws of Fury: The Legend of Hank, Charles Heathbar in The Simpsons episode "Homer Simpson, This Is Your Wife", Narrator in the SpongeBob SquarePants episode "Truth or Square", Billy Finn in the Family Guy episode "Be Careful What You Fish For", Hedgehog in Orphanage in the BoJack Horseman episode "Out to Sea", himself in the Scooby-Doo and Guess Who? episode "Ollie Ollie In-Come Free!", and The Simpsons episode "Angry Dad: The Movie", co-creator and co-host of The Ricky Gervais Show).
 June 29: Sharon Lawrence, American actress (voice of Maxima in the Superman: The Animated Series episode "Warrior Queen", Scarlett Reynolds in the  American Dad! episode "The Scarlett Getter").

July
 July 4: Ted Elliott, American screenwriter and film producer (Aladdin, Shrek).
 July 5: Patrizia Scianca, Italian actress (dub voice of Sailor Neptune in Sailor Moon, Suneo in Doraemon, Zakuro Fujiwara in Tokyo Mew Mew, Maurice "Twister" Rodriguez in Rocket Power, Judy Neutron in The Adventures of Jimmy Neutron, Boy Genius, Bunnie Rabbot in Sonic the Hedgehog).
 July 15: 
Forest Whitaker, American actor, producer, director, and activist (voice of Lonnie Brewster in Everyone's Hero, Lian Chu in Dragon Prince, Ira in Where the Wild Things Are, Ernest in Ernest and Celestine, the Turlingtons in American Dad!, Saw Gerrera in Star Wars Rebels).
Bill White, American animator and comics artist (Spümcø, Walt Disney Company, DiC Entertainment), (d. 2012).
 July 23:
 David Kaufman, American voice actor (voice of the title characters in Danny Phantom and Stuart Little, Jimmy Olsen in the DC Animated Universe, Dexter Douglas in Freakazoid!, Marty McFly in Back to the Future, Human Torch in The Avengers: Earth's Mightiest Heroes, Aldrin Pesky in The Buzz on Maggie).
 Woody Harrelson, American actor and playwright (voice of Roy Arnie in Free Jimmy, Jake in Free Birds, Woody Boyd in The Simpsons episode "Fear of Flying").
 July 28: Gene Laufenberg, American television producer and writer (Duckman, Pinky and the Brain, Family Guy, Spidey and His Amazing Friends, Boy Girl Dog Cat Mouse Cheese).
 July 30: Laurence Fishburne, American actor (voice of Thrax in Osmosis Jones, narrator in TMNT,  Seko the Zebra in Khumba, the Beyonder in Moon Girl and Devil Dinosaur).
 Specific date unknown: Daniel St. Pierre, American film director (Everyone's Hero, Legends of Oz: Dorothy's Return), art director, (Tarzan), voice actor, animator, (Filmation), and musician.

August
 August 4: 
 Chris Landreth, American animator (Ryan).
 Lauren Tom, American voice actress (voice of Amy Wong in Futurama, Dana Tan in Batman Beyond, Numbuh 3 in Codename: Kids Next Door, Jinx and Gizmo in Teen Titans and Teen Titans Go!, Princess Su in Mulan II, Minh and Connie Souphanousinphone in King of the Hill, Zyx in Legion of Super Heroes, Angela Chen in Superman: The Animated Series, Yoshiko in Kim Possible).
 Barack Obama, American politician and 44th president of the United States (producer of Ada Twist, Scientist and We the People).
 August 5: Tawny Kitaen, American actress, model and media personality (voice of Annabelle in Eek! The Cat), (d. 2021).
 August 8:
 The Edge, English-born Irish musician and member of U2 (voiced himself in The Simpsons episode "Trash of the Titans", performed the first theme of The Batman).
 Natatcha Estébanez, Puerto Rican-born American television producer (Postcards from Buster), (d. 2007).
 August 9: Ted Stearn, American comics artist, animator, storyboard artist (Beavis and Butt-Head Do America, Daria, Downtown, Drawn Together, King of the Hill, Squirrel Boy, Sit Down, Shut Up, Futurama, Rick and Morty, Animals.) and director (Daria, Beavis and Butt-Head), (d. 2019).
 August 13: Dawnn Lewis, American actress (voice of Carol Freeman in Star Trek: Lower Decks, Lela in Kid 'n Play, Terri Lee in Spider-Man, Sheeva in Mortal Kombat: Defenders of the Realm, Di Archer in Bruno the Kid, Sharona Johnson in King of the Hill, LaBarbera Conrad in Futurama, Bessie in Charlotte's Web 2: Wilbur's Great Adventure, Sonja Briggs in Heavy Gear: The Animated Series, Carolyn Baker in Holly Hobbie & Friends, The Boss' Wife in The Life & Times of Tim, Malora in Strange Frame: Love & Sax, Maybelle Mundy in Bunyan and Babe, Jeanette in Bravest Warriors, April McStuffins in Doc McStuffins, Fannie Granger in Spirit Riding Free, Mrs. Parker in Curious George, Patty, Cinnamon Bun, Croissant and Hot Tea in Apple & Onion, Chief in Carmen Sandiego, Professor Klabrax V in Cleopatra in Space, Groomer, Lauren, Gnarled Seagull and The Very Old One in HouseBroken, Jackie Washington in Karma's World, Brickhouse in the Static Shock episode "Army of Darkness").
 August 20: Tuck Tucker, American animator (Filmation, The Little Mermaid, The Simpsons, Rugrats, The Ren & Stimpy Show), storyboard artist (ALF: The Animated Series, Alf Tales, 2 Stupid Dogs, Klasky Csupo, Nickelodeon Animation Studio, Cartoon Network Studios, Looney Tunes, Family Guy, All Hail King Julien), sheet timer (Clarence), writer (SpongeBob SquarePants, Camp Lazlo) and director (Nickelodeon Animation Studio, Drawn Together), (d. 2020).
 August 21: 
 Stephen Hillenburg, American animator, writer, artist, cartoonist and marine biologist (writer and director of Rocko's Modern Life, creator of SpongeBob SquarePants), (d. 2018).
 Stephen Stanton, American voice actor and visual effects artist (voice of Grand Moff Tarkin in the Star Wars franchise, AP-5 and Ben Kenobi in Star Wars Rebels, Sleepy in The 7D, Tomax and Xamot in G.I. Joe: Renegades, Pigeon Man in Hey Arnold!: The Jungle Movie, Smitty and Needleman in Monsters at Work, Pete Puma in Looney Tunes Cartoons).
 August 23: Nik Ranieri, Canadian-American animator (The Raccoons, Walt Disney Animation Studios, The Simpsons).
 August 25:
 Kirk Benson, American film editor (King of the Hill, American Dad!, The Cleveland Show, Family Guy), (d. 2021).
 Joanne Whalley, English actress (voice of Emerald Empress and Phantom Girl in the Justice League Unlimited episode "Far From Home").
 Specific date unknown: Stanley Townsend, Irish actor (voice of Victor Hugo, Vladimir Trunkov, and Ivan in Cars 2).

September
 September 1: Bob Schooley, American recording assistant (DIC Entertainment), television writer (DIC Entertainment, Disney Television Animation) and producer (The Penguins of Madagascar, Monsters vs. Aliens, co-creator of Kim Possible).
 September 6: Bruce W. Smith, American animator, character designer, film director, and television producer (creator of The Proud Family).
 September 11:
 E.G. Daily, American voice actress and singer (voice of Tommy Pickles in Rugrats, Buttercup in The Powerpuff Girls).
 Virginia Madsen, American actress and filmmaker (voice of Cleopatra in Scooby-Doo! in Where's My Mummy?, Hippolyta in Wonder Woman, Silver Sable in Spider-Man: The New Animated Series, Roulette in Justice League Unlimited, Arella in the Teen Titans episode "The Prophecy", Commander Heera in the Voltron: Legendary Defender episode "Hole in the Sky", Sarah Corwin in the Justice League episode "The Brave and the Bold").
 September 15:
 Dan Marino, American former football quarterback (voice of Garth Sinew in The Magic School Bus episode "Works Out", himself in The Simpsons episode "Sunday, Cruddy Sunday").
 Colin McFarlane, English actor (voice of Chief in The Queen's Corgi, Beresford in Thomas & Friends, Sergeant Slipper in Dennis and Gnasher, JJ and Skip in Bob the Builder, Belly-Up in Zack & Quack, Sparkle in Mike the Knight, Malcolm Williams in Fireman Sam).
 September 16: Jen Tolley, American-Canadian actress.
 September 18: James Gandolfini, American actor and producer (voice of Carol in Where the Wild Things Are), (d. 2013).
 September 21: Nancy Travis, American actress (voice of Bernice, Beatrice, Beverly and Grandma-ma Sophia in Duckman, Grelch in Aaahh!!! Real Monsters, Spencer in The Real Adventures of Jonny Quest episode "Rage's Burning Wheel", Darci Mason in the Superman: The Animated Series episode "Obsession", Cat in The Wild Thornberrys episode "Queen of Denial").
 September 22:
 Bradley Carow, American film editor (Nickelodeon Animation Studio), track reader (Warner Bros. Animation, Timon & Pumbaa, House of Mouse, Cartoon Network Studios) and composer (SpongeBob SquarePants, Poochini).
 Bonnie Hunt, American actress and comedian (voice of Sally Carrera in the Cars franchise, Dolly in the Toy Story franchise, Tilly in Sofia the First, Rosie in A Bug's Life, Ms. Flint in the Monsters, Inc. franchise, Bonnie Hopps in Zootopia).
 September 23: Chi McBride, American actor (voice of Nick Fury in Avengers Assemble, Ultimate Spider-Man, Hulk and the Agents of S.M.A.S.H., and the Phineas and Ferb episode "Phineas and Ferb: Mission Marvel", Jefferson Smith in Max Steel, Mike in God, the Devil and Bob, Metcalf in Beavis and Butt-Head Do the Universe).
 September 24: Michael Tavera, American composer (Hanna-Barbera, DIC Entertainment, Universal Cartoon Studios, Toonsylvania, Nickelodeon Animation Studio, Mike Young Productions, Disney Television Animation, Time Squad, Warner Bros. Animation, The Secret Saturdays, Max Steel, Monsuno, The Awesomes, Guardians of the Galaxy, Star Wars Resistance, The Bug Diaries) and orchestrator (Captain N: The Game Master, The New Adventures of He-Man, Sabrina: The Animated Series).
 September 30: Michael Preister, American television writer (Johnny Test).

October
 October 1: Steve Purcell, American cartoonist and animator (Pixar, creator of Sam & Max).
 October 4: Kazuki Takahashi, Japanese manga artist (creator of Yu-Gi-Oh!), (d. 2022).
 October 10: Jodi Benson, American actress and singer (voice of Ariel in The Little Mermaid franchise, House of Mouse, Sofia the First and Ralph Breaks the Internet, the title characters in P.J. Sparkles and Thumbelina, Tula in The Pirates of Dark Water, Belle in A Christmas Carol, Ann Darrow in The Mighty Kong, Helen of Troy in Hercules, Barbie in the Toy Story franchise, Asenath in Joseph: King of Dreams, Lady in Lady and the Tramp II: Scamp's Adventure, Jenna in Balto II: Wolf Quest, Lenee in Rapsittie Street Kids: Believe in Santa, Captain Torelli and Princess Incense in Duck Dodgers, Anita Ratcliffe in 101 Dalmatians II: Patch's London Adventure, Lastelle's Mother in Nausicaä of the Valley of the Wind, Patsy Smiles, Ms. Jane Doe and Almondine in Camp Lazlo, Queen Emmaline in Sofia the First, Amber O'Malley in the Pepper Ann episode "Green-Eyed Monster", Aquagirl in the Batman Beyond episode "The Call", Diana in the Clarence episode "The Tails of Mardrynia", Tammy Gobblesworth in The Loud House episode "Flip This Flip").
 October 16: Robert F. Hughes, American animator, storyboard artist (Phineas and Ferb, Bunnicula, Where's Waldo?, Tom and Jerry in New York), sheet timer (The Critic, Klasky Csupo, Nickelodeon Animation Studio, Recess: School's Out, Family Guy, The Proud Family Movie, Ben 10, Phineas and Ferb, Farzar), writer (Phineas and Ferb, Bunnicula, Tom and Jerry in New York), producer (Phineas and Ferb, Milo Murphy's Law) and director (Rocko's Modern Life, The Angry Beavers, The Fantastic Voyages of Sinbad the Sailor, Evil Con Carne, The Grim Adventures of Billy & Mandy, Phineas and Ferb, Bunnicula, Milo Murphy's Law, Mira, Royal Detective).
 October 19: Simon Wells, English animator (Who Framed Roger Rabbit), storyboard artist (DreamWorks Animation, Legends of Oz: Dorothy's Return, Sausage Party, The Lego Ninjago Movie, Michael Jackson's Halloween, Smallfoot), writer (Mars Needs Moms) and director (Amblimation, The Prince of Egypt, Mars Needs Moms).
 October 25: Chad Smith, American musician, drummer and member of the Red Hot Chili Peppers (voiced himself in The Simpsons episode "Krusty Gets Kancelled").
 October 26: John A. Davis, American film director, writer, animator, actor and composer (creator of Jimmy Neutron, founder of DNA Productions).
 October 30: Larry Wilmore, American comedian, writer, producer and actor (voice of Principal Larry in Penn Zero: Part-Time Hero, co-creator of The PJs).

November
 November 4:
 Jeff Probst, American television host and producer (voice of Vice Principal Raycliff in Fillmore!, himself in the Family Guy episode "Petey IV").
 Ralph Macchio, American actor (voice of Timmy in The Secret of NIMH 2: Timmy to the Rescue, Daniel LaRusso in the Robot Chicken episode "Caffeine-Induced Aneurysm").

 November 7: Chris Lang, British television writer, actor, producer and musician (voice of Pigling Bland in The World of Peter Rabbit and Friends, Tiger, Jake, Pig, Arnold, The Bleeper People, Ghost and Mr. Frog in Kipper, Animals in Percy the Park Keeper).
 November 14: D. B. Sweeney, American actor (voice of Aladar in Dinosaur, Sitka in Brother Bear, Aang in The Legend of Korra).
 November 19: Meg Ryan, American actress (voice of Dr. Blight in Captain Planet and the Planeteers, the title character in Anastasia, Dr. Swanson in The Simpsons episode "Yokel Chords").
 November 23: Andy Knight, Canadian animator, film and television director and actor (creator of Ned's Newt, Pig City and Get Ed), (d. 2008).
 November 26: Wes Archer, American animation director and storyboard artist (The Simpsons, Futurama, King of the Hill, Bob's Burgers, Rick and Morty, Disenchantment).
 November 27: Steve Oedekerk, American actor, comedian, director, editor, producer, and screenwriter (Jimmy Neutron: Boy Genius, Barnyard).
 November 28: Martin Clunes, English actor, comedian, director and television presenter (voice of the title characters in Kipper and Merlin the Magical Puppy, Stripy in Little Robots, Dog in Room on the Broom).
 November 29: Tom Sizemore, American actor (voice of Rex Mason / Metamorpho in the Justice League episode "Metamorphosis"), (d. 2023).

December
 December 2: Ken Keeler, American television producer and writer (The Critic, The Simpsons, The PJs, Futurama, Disenchantment).
 December 16: LaChanze, American actress, singer, and dancer (voice of Terpsichore in the Hercules franchise).
 December 21: Stephen Shea, American former child actor (voice of Linus van Pelt in Play It Again, Charlie Brown, Snoopy Come Home, You're Not Elected, Charlie Brown, There's No Time for Love, Charlie Brown, A Charlie Brown Thanksgiving, It's a Mystery, Charlie Brown, It's the Easter Beagle, Charlie Brown and Be My Valentine, Charlie Brown).
 December 24:
 Spike Brandt, American animator, producer, director, screenwriter, and actor (Warner Bros. Animation).
 Wade Williams, American actor (voice of Two-Face in Batman: The Dark Knight Returns, Killer Croc in Beware the Batman, Black Mask in Batman: Under the Red Hood, Deegan in Green Lantern: Emerald Knights, Perry White in Superman: Unbound, Mantis in the Batman: The Brave and the Bold episode "Cry Freedom Fighters!").

Specific date unknown
 Teresa Drilling, American animator, director, and designer (Claymation Comedy of Horrors, Chicken Run, Elf, The Curse of the Were-Rabbit, Creature Comforts, the Community episode "Abed's Uncontrollable Christmas", The Simpsons episode "Angry Dad: The Movie").
 John Statema, American comic book artist, illustrator, storyboard artist (The Angry Beavers) and character designer (The Angry Beavers, Jackie Chan Adventures).
 Juraj Korda, Australian animator (Li'l Elvis and the Truckstoppers, John Callahan's Quads!, Dogstar), (d. 2007).

Deaths

January
 January 16: Joseph Dubin, American composer (Walt Disney Animation Studios), dies at age 60.

February
 February 18: Cliff Nazarro, American actor (voice of Eddie Cackler in Slap-Happy Pappy), dies at age 57.
February 27: Nate Collier, American animator, illustrator and comics artist, dies at age 77.

July
 July 28: Noburo Ofuji, Japanese filmmaker and animator, dies at age 61.

November
  November 28: Arthur Melbourne-Cooper, British filmmaker and stop-motion animation pioneer, dies at age 87.
 Specific date unknown: Hy Hirsh, American photographer and film director, dies at age 59 or 60.

See also
1961 in anime

Sources

External links 
Animated works of the year, listed in the IMDb

 
1960s in animation